This is a list of lighthouses in Marshall Islands.

Lighthouses

See also
 Lists of lighthouses and lightvessels

References

External links
 

Marshall Islands
Lighthouses